Promenesta leucomias is a moth in the family Depressariidae. It was described by Edward Meyrick in 1925. It is found in Pará, Brazil.

The wingspan is 13–14 mm. The forewings are rather light fuscous with the costal edge yellow ochreous and with a round apex and termen, as well as a series of short dark fuscous marks separated by pale ochreous. The hindwings are dark grey.

References

Moths described in 1925
Promenesta
Taxa named by Edward Meyrick